Mohammad Imran (born 20 January 2001) is a Pakistani cricketer. He made his List A debut on 18 January 2021, for Khyber Pakhtunkhwa, in the 2020–21 Pakistan Cup. He made his Twenty20 debut on 21 February 2021, for Peshawar Zalmi in the 2021 Pakistan Super League. In December 2021, he was signed by the Karachi Kings following the players' draft for the 2022 Pakistan Super League.

References

External links
 

2001 births
Living people
Pakistani cricketers
Khyber Pakhtunkhwa cricketers
Peshawar Zalmi cricketers
Karachi Kings cricketers
Place of birth missing (living people)